Vasyl Stepanovych Kuk ( (pseudonym Koval); 11 January 1913 – 9 September 2007) was a Ukrainian nationalist who was the last leader of the Ukrainian Insurgent Army, following the death of Roman Shukhevych. In 1954, he was captured by the USSR KGB troops and spent 6 years in prison without a court sentence.

Biography

Vasyl Kuk was born in Krasne, Zolochiv County, Kingdom of Galicia and Lodomeria, Austria-Hungary now in Zolochiv Raion, Lviv Oblast, Ukraine on 11 January 1913. He studied law at the Catholic University of Lublin and joined the radical Organization of Ukrainian Nationalists (OUN). In 1937 he went underground to escape the Polish police. In 1941, he became one of the OUN's leaders. During World War II, he headed an OUN-organized anti-Nazi underground in Dnipropetrovsk Ukrainian Soviet Socialist Republic (now Dnipro, Ukraine) from 1942 to 1943, before returning to western Ukraine. After leader Roman Shukhevych's death in 1950, Kuk assumed the role of commander of the UPA and of the OUN in Ukraine. Kuk was captured by Soviet forces in 1954. After six years of imprisonment and interrogation, he was amnestied and allowed to move to Kiev. After obtaining a philosophy degree from Kiev University, he worked at Institute of History of the Academy of Sciences of the Ukrainian SSR before his eventual dismissal as an undesirable following the publication of his book Marxism-Leninism about the Ukrainian National Question. In the 1990s he became active in UPA veteran affairs. He died at the age of 94 and was buried in his native village. He was described by Viktor Yushchenko, Ukraine's president from 2005 to 2010, as the "personification of the Ukrainian idea".

Statement to the Ukrainians

In 1960 Vasyl Kuk wrote an open letter. He directed his statement to the Ukrainians living outside the Soviet Union. Kuk read his letter over the Soviet radio on 19 September 1960. His letter was then reprinted by the Soviet press and eventually by the newspapers in the US and Canada.

In the letter Kuk admits his anti-Bolshevik activity before, during and after World War II, partly explaining it with his own "misguidance" and partly deploring it. Next he states that he had been arrested, but later released by decree of the Supreme Council of the Ukrainian SSR and now along with his wife is a "free citizen of Ukrainian SSR."

The biggest part of the letter is devoted to the proof that there is no longer any need for underground resistance in Ukraine and that rebellion against Communism is synonymous with the rebellion against the Ukrainian nation. Kuk stated that although it may be true that in the times of the "personality cult" of Stalin the conditions were not too favorable, but not really as bad, as the nationalists indicate and now under Nikita Sergeyevich Khrushchev things are truly fine and if you do not believe it then "come and see for yourself."

Death and burial 
V. Kuk died on 9 September 2007, in his apartment in Kyiv. Farewell to the last the commander-in-chief of the  Ukrainian Insurgent Army was held in Kyiv at the Teacher's House, then his body was transported to Lviv, where the funeral service continued. Kuk was buried in his homeland - in the village of Krasne, Lviv region.

References

External links
Encyclopedia of Ukraine entry
BBC (Ukrainian) The last commander of UPA, Vasyl Kuk, died
Lubomyr Luciuk, Professor of Geography, Royal Military College of Canada, Globe and Mail, September 15th, 2007

1913 births
2007 deaths
People from Lviv Oblast
People from the Kingdom of Galicia and Lodomeria
Ukrainian Austro-Hungarians
Members of the Ukrainian Greek Catholic Church
Organization of Ukrainian Nationalists politicians
Ukrainian people of World War II
Commanders of the Ukrainian Insurgent Army
Prisoners and detainees of the Soviet Union